Frank Craig Pandolfe (born 1958) is a retired Vice Admiral in the United States Navy, and last served as the Assistant to the Chairman of the Joint Chiefs of Staff. Before, he was the Director, Strategic Plans and Policy, J-5, the Joint Staff. He had his retirement ceremony in September 2017, after more than 40 years of service.

Career
Frank Pandolfe is from Scituate, Massachusetts where he was a star track athlete before graduating from Scituate High School in 1976. Pandolfe graduated from the United States Naval Academy in 1980. He later obtained a Ph.D. from The Fletcher School of Law and Diplomacy at Tufts University in Boston, Massachusetts.

Pandolfe commanded USS Mitscher (DDG-57) from 1999 to 2001. During that time, the ship was awarded the Battle Efficiency Award three times. He later served in the War in Afghanistan (2001–present).

Other positions he has held include serving in the Offices of the Chief of Naval Operations, Joint Staff and in the White House. He also served as Commander, of the United States Sixth Fleet. He is the Chief Strategy Officer and Executive Vice President for Corporate Development for Caliburn International.

Awards and decorations

References

1958 births
Living people
United States Naval Academy alumni
The Fletcher School at Tufts University alumni
United States Navy personnel of the War in Afghanistan (2001–2021)
Recipients of the Meritorious Service Medal (United States)
Recipients of the Legion of Merit
United States Navy admirals
Recipients of the Defense Superior Service Medal
Recipients of the Navy Distinguished Service Medal
Recipients of the Defense Distinguished Service Medal